The 1970–71 NBA season was the Hawks' 22nd season in the NBA and third season in Atlanta.

Offseason

Draft picks

Roster

Regular season

Season standings

z – clinched division title
y – clinched division title
x – clinched playoff spot

Record vs. opponents

Game log

Playoffs

|- align="center" bgcolor="#ffcccc"
| 1
| March 25
| @ New York
| L 101–112
| Pete Maravich (23)
| Bill Bridges (13)
| Hazzard, Maravich (5)
| Madison Square Garden19,500
| 0–1
|- align="center" bgcolor="#ccffcc"
| 2
| March 27
| @ New York
| W 113–104
| Lou Hudson (35)
| Bill Bridges (36)
| Pete Maravich (5)
| Madison Square Garden19,500
| 1–1
|- align="center" bgcolor="#ffcccc"
| 3
| March 28
| New York
| L 95–110
| Walt Bellamy (29)
| Walt Bellamy (18)
| Walt Hazzard (7)
| Alexander Memorial Coliseum7,192
| 1–2
|- align="center" bgcolor="#ffcccc"
| 4
| March 30
| New York
| L 107–113
| Walt Bellamy (25)
| Bill Bridges (18)
| Walt Hazzard (9)
| Alexander Memorial Coliseum7,192
| 1–3
|- align="center" bgcolor="#ffcccc"
| 5
| April 1
| @ New York
| L 107–111
| Lou Hudson (29)
| Bellamy, Bridges (20)
| Walt Bellamy (5)
| Madison Square Garden19,500
| 1–4
|-

Awards and records
Pete Maravich, NBA All-Rookie Team 1st Team

References

Atlanta
Atlanta Hawks seasons
Atlanta
Atlanta